Wimpey may refer to:
Wimpey Homes, a defunct housebuilding company based in England
Taylor Wimpey, housebuilding company based in England

Wimpy  may refer to:

J. Wellington Wimpy, a hamburger-loving character from the Popeye cartoons
Wimpy (restaurant), a chain of hamburger restaurants, named after the cartoon character
Mr. Wimpy (character) cartoon character created for brand promotion
Mr. Wimpy (video game)
Wimpy's Diner, a chain of 1950s–1960s themed diners found in southern Ontario
Wimpy P-1 (born 1937), first registered American Quarter Horse
Luther "Wimpy" Lassiter (1918–2001), world-class American pool player known throughout his career by the Wimpy nickname
The Vickers Wellington bomber aircraft, commonly known as the "Wimpy" amongst service personnel
Diary of a Wimpy Kid  is a 2007 children's novel by Jeff Kinney, the first of a series.
 William "Wimpy" Winpisinger (1924-1997), President of the International Association of Machinists  
Wimpy Operation in the 1982 Lebanon War

See also
Wimp (disambiguation)